The 2011 FIFA Women's World Cup qualification UEFA Group 1 was a UEFA qualifying group for the 2011 FIFA Women's World Cup. The group comprised France, Iceland, Serbia, Northern Ireland, Croatia and Estonia. It was the only six-team group (the other seven having only five teams each). 

The group was won by France who advanced to the play-off rounds.

Standings

Results

Goalscorers
There were 109 goals scored over 30 matches by 40 players, 2 of them own goals.  The goal average was 3.63 goals/gm.

2 goals

 Signy Aarna 
 Sonia Bompastor
 Élise Bussaglia
 Jovana Damnjanović
 Candie Herbert
 Louisa Necib
 Helen McKenna
 Anastassia Morkovkina
 Kaire Palmaru

1 goal

 Josipa Bokanović
 Edda Garðarsdóttir
 Rakel Hönnudóttir
 Alexandra Hurst
 Maja Joščak
 Kristina Krstić
 Iva Landeka
 Dóra María Lárusdóttir
 Izabela Lojna
 Rakel Logadóttir
 Julie Nelson
 Katrín Ómarsdóttir
 Anete Paulus
 Milena Pešić
 Danka Podovac
 Sandrine Soubeyrand
 Jovana Sretenović
 Lidija Stojkanović

Own goals

 Geit Prants (for France)
 Anastassia Morkovkina (for Iceland)
 Ashley Hutton (for France)

External links
 Regulations of the European Qualifying Competition for the 6th FIFA Women's World Cup

1
2009–10 in French women's football
Qual
2009–10 in Croatian football
2010–11 in Croatian football
2009–10 in Northern Ireland association football
2010–11 in Northern Ireland association football
2009–10 in Serbian football
2010–11 in Serbian football
2009 in Estonian football
2010 in Estonian football
2009 in Icelandic football
2010 in Icelandic football